The Boat Gauging House is a building in Tipton, West Midlands, England. It is situated by the Main Line of the Birmingham Canal Navigations, and was used for calibrating new canal boats in order later to ascertain the weight of cargo carried. It is a Grade II listed building.

Background
Canal companies charged boats for using the canals, the fees, based on the weight of the cargo, being collected at toll points. In order to assess the weight of cargo, boats were initially calibrated. The "wet" method was done during the building of the boat; the Birmingham Canal Navigations (BCN) used the "dry" method, in which a new or refitted boat was loaded from empty with ton weights, and the resulting freeboard, or "dry inches", as the boat sat lower in the water, was each time noted. Gauging plates were then fixed to the boat.

Description and history
The BCN built gauging houses (or gauging stations) at Smethwick in 1872, and at Tipton in 1873. The Tipton gauging house could accommodate boats up to the coal-carrying "Hampton" boats of eighty feet in length. It was in use until gauging and toll collection was abandoned in 1959.

The building is next to the Factory Locks at Tipton. It is built of red and blue bricks laid in English bond, and has a hipped roof. The interior originally had two docks (since filled in) running west–east, lock gates inside the western doorways, and internal cranes.

References

External links
 Tipton heritage trail leaflet from Sandwell Metropolitan Borough Council

Grade II listed buildings in the West Midlands (county)
Tipton
Buildings and structures in Sandwell
Birmingham Canal Navigations
Toll (fee)